An unusually intense fall outbreak of tornadoes caused considerable damage to the Mississippi and Ohio Valleys. One person was killed, 35 others were injured, and damages reached $4.665 million (1955 USD). A total of 13 other people were killed and over 32 others were injured by non-tornadic events as well.

Meteorological synopsis
A low-pressure system formed over Nevada on November 14 and moved quickly eastward into Nebraska by the next day. It slowed down and rapidly deepened as it moved through Northwestern Iowa into Wisconsin by November 16. Favorable conditions led to a huge blow up of thunderstorms across the Mississippi and Ohio Valleys. These storms quickly became severe and tornadic as they moved generally eastward.

Confirmed tornadoes

Note: The CDNS list several other suspected tornadoes that were not included in the final total.
A suspected tornado accompanied by damaging straight-line winds destroyed two homes, damaged four others, and downed wires and trees in Kirklin, Terhune and Elizaville, Indiana on November 15.
A suspected tornado accompanied by straight-line winds and heavy rain smashed several barns and damaged three homes in Polks Park, Indiana before moving into Gentryville, where two filling stations were demolished and three homes were damaged on November 15.

November 15 event

November 16 event

Heber Springs–Hutchinson–Huff–Northern Newark, Arkansas

The only fatal one of the outbreak, this long-tracked, strong F3 tornado was first seen as a funnel cloud southwest of Heber Springs. The funnel moved northeastward before touching down on the southeast side of town and moving over Round Mountain. Severe property damage occurred in this area and one person was injured. It then crossed over the Little Red River, moving over mountainous terrain before moving into Independence County. Throughout Cleburne County, one person was injured, seven homes and four buildings were destroyed, 107 homes and 40 other buildings were damaged, and there was $250,000 in damage.

Moving into Independence County, the tornado caused catastrophic damage as it hit the town of Floral. Multiple structures in several areas were destroyed and one person was injured. It moved back over mountainous terrain before causing more destruction in Hutchinson, which saw $250,000 in damage when multiple areas were destroyed. The lone fatality from the entire outbreak, as well as two injuries, occurred here. The tornado then turned east-northeast and reached its peak intensity, causing heavy damage in Huff and near Rosie. The tornado then moved into Magness, damaging 20 homes, a church, a feed mill, and other buildings. The tornado was last spotted in Wycough Township north of Newark, where a home was destroyed and three houses and a church were damaged. Shortly afterwards, the tornado dissipated south of Mt. Carmel. Throughout Independence County, the tornado destroyed 22 homes and 18 other buildings, damaged 29 homes and 22 other buildings, and caused one death, three injuries, and $750,000 in damage.

One person was killed and four others were injured. The tornado was rated F2 by Grazulis.

Eastern Evansville, Indiana

A very destructive, nighttime F3 tornado touched down right over Eastern Evansville and heavily damaged the area, destroying five homes and damaging 70 others. In one extreme case, a house was twisted off its foundation and blown away with its heavy window air conditioning unit thrown into the yard, a post driven through the storm door and through the roof before it was blown off, and a metal carport on the property being found over a mile away. Miraculously, all the three people, including the mother, survived, including two small children that were blown off their chairs, rolled up into the living room rug, and lodged under a stone planter box, protecting them from the tornado. It injured nine and caused $250,000 in damage. Witnesses did not see the funnel of the tornado due to the darkness, but did report a roar that sounded like an approaching airplane as it went through.

Lynn, Indiana/Sharpeye–Greenville, Ohio

This large, strong F3 tornado touched down west of Lynn, Indiana and moved northeastward. A home in the path was obliterated, injuring all seven occupants, including a young child who was stripped of clothing. The residents of the home heard a "train" roar as the tornado approached and a passing motorists saw the funnel and house before a bolt a lightning revealed the destroyed home. Two cars on the property were tossed into an adjacent field as well. In the vicinity of Carlos, Lynn, and Spartansburg, the tornado wrecked and smashed a garage and a school bus, damaged many roofs, sheds and barns, and flattened corn to the tune of 50% losses before crossing into Ohio. At this point, the tornado was moving more east-northeastward and skipping, passing Sharpeye, Longtown, and Nashville. The Commodity Credit Corporation and the surrounding area suffered damage to farm buildings, utility lines, some standing crops, and large grain bins. One man was injured by flying glass in this area. The tornado then moved into areas just north of the city limits of Greenville before finally dissipating. There were eight injuries and $2.525 million in damage.

Non-tornadic impacts
Many hail and wind reports came out of this event. Illinois saw many large hail reports on November 15 with baseball-sized hail being recorded in rural Northern Effingham County as well as Western Browns.

On November 15 in Gibson and near Fagus, Missouri, several barns were damaged by winds and lightning burned a house to the ground. In Spiceland, Indiana, a trailer and its contents were extensively damaged when it was picked and thrown by the winds and two people were killed when they came into contact with high-voltage power lines that were blown down. A young man was also killed in Huntington County, Indiana when he was struck by lightning while hunting. Lightning also destroyed a grain elevator in Gwynneville, Indiana. Many large and very large hail reports came out of Indiana, including some hailstones that reached  in diameter west of Lebanon. The towns of Milledgeville, Whitestown, Kingman, Alamo, Middleton, and New Market were all heavily damaged by severe hail with New Market describing it as "rough hunks of ice the size of hens' eggs". Overnight in Centerville, Ohio, straight-line winds and heavy rains damaged farm buildings and flooded basements, injuring three. High-tension lines were also downed, killing one person that came in contact with it. The event was unofficially referred to as a tornado, although a through investigation determined that it was straight-line winds. Early the next morning in Franklin, Arkansas, very heavy rain forced the Sugar Creek and Youngs Creek out of their banks, necessitating evacuation of 45-50 families and causing damage to household furnishings, some commercial establishments, warehouses, and basements, closed the main highway in town, and undermined some sections of pavement. Straight-line winds on November 16 destroyed a cinder block house in Somerset County, Pennsylvania, injuring three while five others were injured in Chicago due to winds breaking out a store window. Chicago also saw broken trees, downed power lines, and more shattered windows.

The storm system transitioned when it got into Iowa on November 15, producing blizzard conditions in Wisconsin while also generating snow and high winds over Iowa, Michigan and New York. This was the deadliest part of the event, killing nine and injuring over 20, including one 12-year-old boy in Washburn County, Wisconsin that suffocated in heavy snow on November 17.

See also
 List of North American tornadoes and tornado outbreaks

Notes

References

Tornadoes of 1955
F3 tornadoes
Tornadoes in Arkansas
Tornadoes in Illinois
Tornadoes in Indiana
Tornadoes in Ohio
Tornadoes in Missouri